Steenvoorde is a commune in the Nord department in northern France. Once part of the Seventeen Provinces of the Low Countries, Steenvoorde was the site of the beginning of the Beeldenstorm, or "Iconoclastic Fury."  Today the city is known for its Géants du Nord, sculptures of giants that can be admired in summer festivals.

Geography

Climate

Steenvoorde has a oceanic climate (Köppen climate classification Cfb).

Heraldry

See also
Communes of the Nord department

References

External links

 Town website

Communes of Nord (French department)
French Flanders